Carlos Leonel Gois Fernandes (born 28 July 1987 in Ribeira Brava, Madeira, Portugal), commonly known as Carlos Leonel, is a former football player and coach for Benfica de Macau. He was the top scorer in the 2016 and 2017 Liga de Elite. He also helped Benfica de Macau win the Liga de Elite from 2015 to 2018.

Club career

Early career
Leonel has been a football player since he was six-years old. He was in Rio de Janeiro, Brazil, doing an exchange program when Carlos Vilar invited him to visit him in Macau and play for three months on Casa de Portugal in the 2ª Divisão de Macau.

Benfica de Macau
During the 2017 AFC Cup qualifying round held at Bishkek in Kyrgyzstan on 21 August 2016, Benfica de Macau played Rovers FC from Guam, Leonel scored twice and Benfica de Macau won the match 4–2.

On 4 March 2017, Leonel scored a hat-trick as Benfica de Macau beat C.D. Monte Carlo 6–0.

On 7 March 2018, Benfica de Macau took part in the 2018 AFC Cup group stage. After losing two goals in the first half to Hang Yuen,  Leonel scored in the 61st and 63rd minutes to help the club overturn the score and won 3–2. It was Benfica de Macau's first ever win in the AFC Cup group stage. Leonel was awarded player of the match. On 16 May, Benfica de Macau beat Hwaebul Sports Club with Leonel scoring a hat-trick on the final day of the group stage. Benfica de Macau finished the second in the group.

On 14 January 2022, Benfica de Macau announced the retirement of Leonel as well as his appointment as the main coach.

International career
On 7 October 2016, Leonel was selected into the Macau national football team for the first time for the Hong Kong–Macau Interport.

On 5 September 2017, Leonel made his debut for Macau in the 2019 AFC Asian Cup qualification Third Round against India, but Macau lost 0–2.

On 2 October 2017, Macau played a friendly against Laos. At 72 minutes, Leonel scored with a header, then 2 minutes later he scored again and helped Macau overturn the score. In the end Macau won the match 3–1.

On 14 November 2017, Macau played Kyrgyzstan, at 87 minutes CLeonel scored, but Macau lost 3–4.

International goals
Macau's goals are listed first

Awards
2016 Liga de Elite top scorer
2017 Liga de Elite top scorer
2021 Liga de Elite top scorer

References

External links
Carlos Leonel facebook page
Carlos Leonel Gois Fernandes Eurosport player profile
Carlos Leonel Futbal 365 player profile

1987 births
Living people
People from Ribeira Brava, Madeira
Macau footballers
Macau international footballers
Association football forwards
Liga de Elite players
S.L. Benfica de Macau players